Jurij Goličič (born April 6, 1981) is a Slovenian retired ice hockey player. He participated at the 2003, 2005, 2006, and 2008 IIHF World Championships as a member of the Slovenia men's national ice hockey team. He is a brother of Boštjan Goličič.

He played for the Owen Sound Platers of the OHL, where during a game in October 1998, he was sucker-punched by Jeff Kugel of the Windsor Spitfires. Kugel was given a 25-game suspension and a lifetime ban from the league (later repealed).

External links

1981 births
HDD Olimpija Ljubljana players
Living people
Owen Sound Platers players
Sportspeople from Kranj
Slovenian ice hockey forwards
Slovenian expatriate ice hockey people
Slovenian expatriate sportspeople in Canada